is a 1977 film directed by Kinji Fukasaku and starring Sonny Chiba and Hiroki Matsukata.

Plot
Kawada Noboru is a peasant from Mikuni who becomes a yakuza in the Tomiyasu Group in Fukui. He holds a letter from his boss Mr. Yasuhara promising that he would receive control of the security business for the speedboat racetrack in exchange for killing Yamada. When Kawada is released from prison in 1968 and Mr. Yasuhara refuses to make good on the deal, Kawada buries him up to his neck and forces him to relinquish control over the security business of the bike race and speedboat race run by their gang.

At a branch office in Tsuruga, Yasuhara asks for help from the Kanai Group, a destructive yakuza organization based in Osaka working under the umbrella of the Asada Group. Their leader, Kanai Hachiro, sends an excessive amount of 50 assassins to kill Kawada and Mantani warns Yasuhara that this is part of Kanai's plan to invade and destroy Fukui. Kawada hides out in the Shiranami House with his lover Nakai Kiku, who works there. Mr. Yoshitama from Kyoto acts as a mediator and arranges a meeting between Kawada and Mr. Kubo, who has been sent by Mr. Okano of the Asada Group to offer support to Kawada in any battles with the Kanai Group, but Kawada is unreceptive.

Kawada is attacked in a diner but the police arrive and stop the fight before he is killed, leaving him seriously injured. Yasuhara appoints Mantani as underboss of the Tomiyasu Group and tells him to take care of Kawada. Mantani is Kanai's sworn brother, so Kawada sees this as another means by which Osaka seeks to control Fukui.

Kiku's younger sister Nobuko and brother Takashi, a yakuza in the Yanaka Group in Kanazawa, take Kawada to their hometown of Wajima to recover. Takashi's boss Oya fears that the Kanai Group will invade if they learn of this, so he tells Takashi to move Kawada to a different location. Mantani visits and Kiku agrees to be his woman if he keeps the secret about Kawada's location. Meanwhile, Kawada begins a relationship with Kiku's sister Nobuko. Kawada attacks the Tomiyasu Group and buries a member up to his neck until he reveals that Mantani is currently at a gambling house run by the Yoshitane Group in Kyoto. Kawada sneaks in and cuts off Mantani's hand, then kills a member of the Kanai Group who mocks him.

While serving time in Hamamatsu Prison for the murder, Kawada is stabbed by Toshimoto of the Kanai Group in Gifu but is saved by Takii of the Yanaka Group, who tells him that Oya, the boss of the Yanaka Group, has been stabbed and that Nakai Takashi has become head of the Kanai branch office.

When Kawada is released in 1973, Takashi's superiors tell him that he will be given control of Mikuni and Kanazawa if he kills Kawada, but Kawada evades them and returns to his old office, where he finds Nobuko waiting for him. Kawada finds Mantani and apologizes to him, but Mantani beats him with his cane. Kawada then confesses to Kiku that he and Nobuko are getting married.

The Asada Group fears that Kanai is going rogue and they plot to take him out. Kiku arranges a meeting between Kawada and Okano Nobuyasu, a chief in the Asada Group, and Okano agrees to secretly assist Kawada. Kawada and some men from the Yanaka Group rob the safe at one of the offices of the Kanai Group, then begin murdering members of the Kanai Group. Kawada forcefully convinces Chairman Ryugasaki in Nagoya to lend him some powerful machine guns. Mantani's men call for reinforcements from Osaka. Yasuhara visits Kawada and asks for his assistance it taking down Mantani, who has become a puppet of the Kanai Group.

Mr. Yobu calls the police to raid the Kanai Group's office in Osaka, where they arrest Kanai Hachiro for illegal weapons possession. Kawada and Okano officially swear loyalty to each other and become bonded brothers. Mantani tells Takashi that he will take him into the Asada Group if he kills Kawada. Takashi beats his sister Nobuko but she will not reveal Kawada's location so Takashi holds her hostage to lure Kawada there. When Kawada and his men arrive and rescue Nobuko, she grabs a knife and kills Takashi, then turns herself in to the police.

Kiku leaves Mantani for Okano. Kawada and Yasuhara visit Mantani in his hideout where he is hiding from potential attacks by Okano and Kawada and Mantani form an alliance against Okano. Takii pays off some old members of the Kanai Group to destroy the bar where Kiku now works. Okano and Kiku assume that Mantani was somehow involved and confront him in the hospital where he is recovering from a heart attack. Mantani agrees to give control of Fukui to Kawada. Kawada brings Okano and Kiki to a field where the Kanai Group members who destroyed the club have been buried up to their necks, then one of his men drives over their heads to kill them and send a message to Okano. Okano leaves in a car and Kiku walks away in the snow.

Cast
Sonny Chiba as Kanai
Hiroki Matsukata as Kawada Noboru
Yumiko Nogawa
Mikio Narita as Mr. Kubo
Yoko Takahashi
Takeo Chii
Tatsuo Endo
Seizo Fukumoto
Hajime Hana
Goro Ibuki
Nenji Kobayashi
Kō Nishimura as Mr. Yasuhara
Junkichi Orimoto as Yanaka
Jirō Yabuki as Hanamaki

Reception
In his book Outlaw Masters of Japanese Film, author Chris Desjardins writes that the film is "another jitsuroku yakuza blitzkrieg, this time set in a snowy Hokkaido coastal town where a murderously independent yakuza boss (Hiroki Matsukata) is bent on gaining tighter control of the territory. Sonny Chiba is slickly venal as an oily, smooth-talking gangster and Ko Nishimura convincing as always, as an elder boss obstinately sticking to his guns. The splendid Yumiko Nogawa unfortunately doesn’t have much to do. Filmed on actual Hokkaido locations, the stormy winter atmosphere is savage and palpably chilling, giving the cold-blooded brutality on display a teeth-chattering edge."

In his Book Spinegrinder: The Movies Most Critics Won't Wrote About, Clive Davies called the film "an absolutely first-class yakuza gangster war thriller that benefits from having the story located in the coastal town of Hokuriku."

References

External links

1970s crime drama films
1977 drama films
1977 films
Films directed by Kinji Fukasaku
Films set in 1968
Films set in 1973
Films set in Fukui Prefecture
Films set in Ishikawa Prefecture
Films set in Shizuoka Prefecture
1970s Japanese-language films
Yakuza films
1970s Japanese films